The Training and Staff Duties Division  and later known as the Tactical and Staff Duties Division  was a directorate of the Admiralty Naval Staff of the Royal Navy responsible for the tactical use of naval weapons and the training of naval personnel in relation to operational requirements from 1917 to 1958.

History
The Training and Staff Duties Division was established as part of the reorganisation of the Admiralty in 1917 under the command of  Rear-Admiral James C. Ley. The DTSD Director of Training and Staff Duties, was a naval officer (usually a captain) employed within the Admiralty he was mainly responsible for the administration of officers education. He was expected to comment on all questions of officer education and suggest answers to problems, but was rarely required to sit on committees and did not have an active role in formatting syllabi. In June 1945 it was renamed Tactical and Staff Duties Division the directorate existed until 1958.

Office of the Directors of Division

Directors Training and Staff Duties Division
Post holders included:

 Rear-Admiral James C. Ley: December 1917-April 1918 
 Captain Herbert W. Richmond: April 1918-January 1919 
 Captain Walter M. Ellerton: January 1919-December 1921 
 Captain Vernon H.S.Haggard: December 1921-September 1923 
 Captain Hugh J.Tweedie: September 1923-January 1926 
 Captain Arthur L. Snagge: January–July 1926 (later vice-admiral)
 Captain Sidney J.Meyrick: July 1926-July 1927 
 Captain Noel F. Laurence: July 1927-April 1928 
 Captain Isham W. Gibson: April–December 1928 (later rear-admiral) 
 Captain Bernard W.M. Fairbairn: December 1928-April 1929 (later vice-admiral) 
 Captain Edward O. Cochrane: April 1929-August 1931 (later rear-admiral) 
 Captain James S. M. Ritchie: August 1931-June 1933 (later rear-admiral) 
 Captain Geoffrey S. Arbuthnot: June 1933-March 1934 
 Captain Frederick A. Buckley: March 1934-May 1936 (later rear-admiral) 
 Captain A. Lumley St. G. Lyster: May 1936-September 1937 
 Captain William L.Jackson: September 1937-April 1940 
 Captain James W. Rivett-Carnac: April 1940-July 1941 
 Captain Richard V. Symonds-Tayler: July 1941-July 1942 
 Captain Harry P. K. Oram: July 1942-June 1945

Directors Tactical and Staff Duties Division
Post Holders included:

 Captain Charles L. Robertson: June 1945-May 1947 
 Captain Royer M. Dick: May 1947-November 1948  (later rear-admiral)  
 Captain Richard G. Onslow: November 1948-April 1951 
 Captain W.Kaye Edden: April 1951-October 1953 
 Captain Walter A. Adair: October 1953-November 1955 
 Captain Guy W. Hawkins: November 1955-January 1958

Deputy Directors of the Training and Staff Duties Division
 Post holders included:

 Captain Guy P. Bigg-Wither, 15 January 1919 – 1 February 1919
 Captain Edward A. Astley-Rushton,  1 February 1919  – 8 February 1921[24]
 Captain Noel F. Laurence, 1 July 1926  – 1 July 1927 
 Captain Isham W. Gibson, 1 July 1927 – 10 April 1928
 Captain Hubert Ardill, 17 March 1930  – 7 December 1931 
 Captain Geoffrey S. Arbuthnot, 14 March 1932  – 18 June 1933 
 Captain Frederick A. Buckley, 16 October 1933   – 14 March 1934

Timeline
 Board of Admiralty, Admiralty Naval Staff, Training and Staff Duties Division (1917-1945).
 Board of Admiralty, Admiralty Naval Staff, Tactical and Staff Duties Division (1945-1958)

Footnotes

References
 Archives, The National. (1917-1921) "Naval Staff Divisions - Reorganisation: Part of Instructions". discovery.nationalarchives.gov.uk. The National Archives. UK, ADM 116/1803. 
 Black, Nicholas (2009). The British Naval Staff in the First World War. Boydell Press. .
 Mackie, Colin. (2011). "Royal Navy Senior Appointments from 1865". http://www.gulabin.com.

Further reading
 

 

Admiralty departments
1917 establishments in the United Kingdom
1958 disestablishments in the United Kingdom